Reformed Baptists (sometimes known as Particular Baptists or Calvinistic Baptists) are Baptists that hold to a Calvinist soteriology (salvation).  The first Calvinistic Baptist church was formed in the 1630s. The 1689 Baptist Confession of Faith was written along Calvinistic Baptist lines. The name “Reformed Baptist” dates from the latter part of the 20th Century to denote Baptists who have adopted elements of Reformed theology, but retained Baptist ecclesiology.

Variations

Strict Baptists

Groups calling themselves Strict Baptists are often differentiated from those calling themselves "Reformed Baptists", sharing the same Calvinist doctrine, but differing on ecclesiastical polity; "Strict Baptists" generally prefer a congregationalist polity.

The group of Strict Baptists called Strict and Particular Baptists are Baptists who believe in a Calvinist interpretation of Christian salvation. The Particular Baptists arose in England in the 17th century and took their name from the doctrine of particular redemption, while the term "strict" refers to the practice of closed communion.

Primitive Baptists

Primitive Baptists adhere to a Reformed soteriology. Primitive Baptists emphasize the teaching that "God alone is the author of salvation and therefore any effort by human beings to make salvation happen or compel others to conversion is simply a form of 'works righteousness' that implies that sinners can affect their own salvation." As such, they have rejected the concept of missions.

Regular Baptists

Regular Baptists adhere to a Reformed soteriology. Those who are Old Regular Baptists largely hold to the tenets of Calvinism, "but maintain that God never predestined anyone to hell and that only those who do not heed the Word of God will be lost."

United Baptists
Certain denominations of United Baptists teach a Reformed soteriology.

Sovereign Grace Baptists
Sovereign Grace Baptists in the broadest sense are any "Calvinistic" Baptists that accept God's sovereign grace in salvation and predestination. In the narrower sense, certain churches and groups have preferred "Sovereign Grace" in their name, rather than using the terms "Calvinism", "Calvinist", or "Reformed Baptist". This includes some who prefer the 1644 Baptist Confession of Faith to the 1689 Confession, and who are critical of covenant theology.

All of these groups generally agree with the Five Points of Calvinism – Total Depravity, Unconditional Election, Limited Atonement, Irresistible Grace, and Perseverance of the Saints. Groups calling themselves "Sovereign Grace Baptists" have been particularly influenced by the writings of John Gill in the 18th century.  Among American Baptists who have revived such Calvinist ideas were Rolfe P. Barnard and Henry T. Mahan, who organised the first Sovereign Grace Bible Conference in Ashland, Kentucky, in 1954, though groups designated as Sovereign Grace are not necessarily connected to them.

Current status
Calvinistic baptist groups presently using the term Sovereign Grace include the Sovereign Grace Baptist Association, the Sovereign Grace Fellowship of Canada, and some among the growing Calvinist strand of Independent Baptists, including several hundred Landmark Independent Baptist churches.

By region

United Kingdom 
Reformed Baptist churches in the UK go back to the 1630s. Notable early pastors include the author John Bunyan (1628–88), Benjamin Keach (1640–1704), the theologian John Gill (1697–1771), John Brine (1703–64), Andrew Fuller, and the missionary William Carey (1761–1834). Charles Spurgeon (1834–92), pastor to the New Park Street Chapel (later the Metropolitan Tabernacle) in London, has been called "by far the most famous and influential preacher the Baptists had." The Metropolitan Tabernacle itself has been particularly influential in the Reformed Baptist movement in the UK. Benjamin Keach, John Gill, John Rippon (1751–1836), Charles Spurgeon, and Peter Masters (mentioned below) have all pastored this same congregation. Their characteristic traits may be the founder (Keach, signer of the 1689), theologian (Gill), hymnist (Rippon), preacher (Spurgeon), and restorer (Masters).

The 1950s saw a renewed interest in Reformed theology among Baptists in the UK.

Peter Masters, pastor of the Metropolitan Tabernacle in London, created the London Reformed Baptist Seminary in 1975.

United States
Baptist churches in the United States continued to operate under the confessional statement, the 1689 London Baptist, but they renamed it according to the local associations in which it was adopted, first the Philadelphia Confession (1742, which includes two new chapters), then the Charleston Confession (1761, adopted from the London without changes). When the Southern Baptist Theological Seminary was founded, its governing confession, the abstract of principles, was summarized form of the 1689 London Baptist Confession, and its founding president, James P. Boyce wrote his *Abstract of Systematic Theology* from an evident Calvinist position. The first major shift at the seminary away from Calvinism came at the leadership of E. Y. Mullins, president from 1899–1928. Many of the developments in the U.K. mentioned above during the 1950s and following also made an impact on Baptists in America, seen especially in the Founders Movement (which was connected to the so-called "Conservative Resurgence" in the SBC) and in the works of men such as Walter Chantry, Roger Nicole, and Ernest Reisinger.

In March 2009, noting the resurgence of Calvinism in the United States, Time listed several Baptists among current Calvinist leaders. Albert Mohler, president of The Southern Baptist Theological Seminary, is a strong advocate of Calvinism, although his stand has received opposition from inside the Southern Baptist Convention. John Piper, who was pastor at Bethlehem Baptist Church in Minneapolis for 33 years, is one of several Baptists who have written in support of Calvinism.

While the Southern Baptist Convention remains split on Calvinism, there are a number of explicitly Reformed Baptist groups in the United States, including the Association of Reformed Baptist Churches of America, the Continental Baptist Churches, the Sovereign Grace Baptist Association of Churches, and other Sovereign Grace Baptists.  Such groups have had some theological influence from other Reformed denominations, such as the Orthodox Presbyterian Church.  An example of this is the 1995 adaptation of the Orthodox Presbyterian Church's Trinity Hymnal which was published for Reformed Baptist churches in America as the Trinity Hymnal (Baptist Edition).

By 2000, Reformed Baptist groups in the United States totalled about 16,000 people in 400 congregations.

Several Reformed Baptist Seminaries currently operate in the US; Reformed Baptist Seminary, IRBS Theological Seminary, Covenant Baptist Theological Seminary, and  Grace Bible Theological Seminary are four that each hold to the 1689 London Baptist Confession.

Sovereign Grace Baptist Association of Churches
The Sovereign Grace Baptist Association of Churches (SGBA), which was organized in 1984, sponsors an annual national conference and churches cooperate in missions, publications, retreats, camps and other activities. The Missionary Committee serves under the Executive Committee to screen candidates and recommend them to the churches for support. They currently (2009) are supporting one missionary endeavour. The Publication Committee reviews and approves submissions, and supplies literature to the churches. Grace News is published quarterly.  A Confession of Faith was adopted in 1991.  Membership in the SGBA is open to any Baptist church subscribing to the Constitution and Articles of Faith. There are 12 member churches, half of which are located in Michigan. The association is recognised as an endorsing agent for United States military chaplains.

Africa
Notable Reformed Baptist figures in Africa include Conrad Mbewe in Zambia, who has been compared to Spurgeon; Kenneth Mbugua and John Musyimi of Emmanuel Baptist Church Nairobi, Kenya.

In South Africa, the Afrikaanse Baptiste Kerke's 34 churches follow reformed doctrine, as opposed to the mainly English speaking Baptist Union of Southern Africa, which does not.

Europe
There is a small but growing network of Reformed Baptist churches in Europe. The Italian churches are organized in the Evangelical Reformed Baptist Churches in Italy association; several French speaking churches sprung from the work of English missionary Stuart Olyott at the Église réformée baptiste de Lausanne, VD, CH, started in the 1960s. There is a growing network of Reformed Baptist Churches in Ukraine. There are few small communities churches in Germany, where the largest is in Frankfurt am Main.

Brazil
In Brazil there is a modest association, the Comunhão Reformada Batista do Brasil, sprung mostly from the work of US missionary Richard Denham at São José dos Campos, SP. As it did not correspond to expectations of dynamism and effectiveness, it is being supplanted by a newer Convention, the Convenção Batista Reformada do Brasil.

Canada

Sovereign Grace Fellowship of Canada

The Sovereign Grace Fellowship of Canada (SGF) is a fellowship for Baptist churches in Canada holding to either the Baptist Confession of 1644 or 1689. SGF had 10 member churches when it was formally inaugurated, located in New Brunswick and Ontario.  As of 2012, there were 14 churches, including the Jarvis Street Baptist Church in Toronto. SGF is one of the Baptist groups associated with the Toronto Baptist Seminary and Bible College.

See also
Baptist successionism
Grace Baptist
List of Reformed Baptist groups
List of Reformed Baptists
New Covenant theology

References

Bibliography 
 .
 .

 
Protestant denominations established in the 17th century
Baptist movements